Styela angularis (angular sea squirt) is a solitary, hermaphroditic ascidian tunicate that is found along the coast of Southern Africa from Lüderitz Bay in Namibia to the Eastern Cape.

Description
Stands upright on the substrate. Cloacal siphon terminal, and oral siphon slightly ventral and posterior.

Behaviour 
Occurs singly on rocks or other hard surfaces where water is clean and fairly fast moving. Often covered by epibionts.

References

External links

Stolidobranchia
Animals described in 1855